Esuan Asqui Crandon (born 17 December 1981) is a first class cricketer who played for Guyana. A right arm fast bowler, Crandon debuted in 2000/01 and has career best innings figures of 7/125. He is known for his skiddy seamers and being economical in the one day form. He was part of the winning Guyana team in the Stanford 20/20 in 2006 and also the winning Guyanese team in the inaugural Caribbean Twenty 20 in 2010, thus qualifying for the 2010 Champions League in South Africa.

Career Best Performances 
as of 13 September 2010

References
 

1981 births
Living people
Guyanese cricketers
People from East Berbice-Corentyne
Guyana cricketers